Barrington is a small village on the Barrington River,  north-west of Gloucester, New South Wales, Australia on Thunderbolts Way.

The small town is considered a main gateway to the Barrington Tops National Park. Its population in 361 and until 2016 was the main tourist attraction in the Gloucester Shire.  The town is also home to a range of heritage structures including the historic Barrington River Bridge, Barrington River Cottage, the pioneer cemetery, and the Barrington Public School (c. 1910).

References

Suburbs of Mid-Coast Council
Towns in the Hunter Region